Hisonotus laevior is a species of catfish in the family Loricariidae. It is native to South America, where it occurs in the Lagoa dos Patos system, ranging from Lagoon Mirim to the Jacuí River basin. It is found in slow to moderate-flowing waters with sandy substrate and submerged vegetation. The species reaches 7.5 cm (3 inches) in total length.

References 

Otothyrinae
Fish described in 1894
Freshwater fish of South America